Verbena peruviana (syn. Glandularia peruviana), the Peruvian mock vervain, is a species of flowering plant in the family Verbenaceae. It is native to Bolivia, southern Brazil,  northern Argentina, Paraguay, and Uruguay, but not Peru, and has been introduced to scattered locations elsewhere, including the former Czechoslovakia, the US state of Illinois, and the Leeward Islands. Under the synonym Glandularia peruviana, its cultivar 'Balendpibi' (trade name ) has gained the Royal Horticultural Society's Award of Garden Merit.

References

peruviana
Garden plants of South America
Flora of Bolivia
Flora of South Brazil
Flora of Northeast Argentina
Flora of Northwest Argentina
Flora of Paraguay
Flora of Uruguay
Plants described in 1893